Transtillaspis lypra is a species of moth of the family Tortricidae. It is found in Napo Province, Ecuador.

The wingspan is 14.5 mm. The ground colour of the forewings is creamy brownish, strigulated (finely streaked) with blackish brown. The markings are dark ochreous brownish. The hindwings are cream brownish, but darker on the periphery.

Etymology
The species name refers to the dark colouration of the forewings and is derived from Greek lypros (meaning sad).

References

Moths described in 2005
Transtillaspis
Moths of South America
Taxa named by Józef Razowski